The 1988 Gent–Wevelgem was the 50th edition of the Gent–Wevelgem cycle race and was held on 20 April 1988. The race started in Ghent and finished in Wevelgem. The race was won by Sean Kelly of the Kas team.

General classification

References

Gent–Wevelgem
1988 in road cycling
1988 in Belgian sport